Palestine Township may refer to the following townships in the United States:

 Palestine Township, Woodford County, Illinois
 Palestine Township, Story County, Iowa
 Palestine Township, Cooper County, Missouri